Torwoodlee Broch  is the remains of an iron-age broch located near the town of Galashiels in the Scottish Borders.

Description
Torwoodlee Broch is situated on the site of an earlier hillfort on the shoulder of a ridge. The hillfort is an irregular oval in shape, measuring about 137 metres by 136 metres. The broch itself lies on the southwest side of the fort and partly on top of the defences. The diameter of the broch is 23.2 metres and the outer wall is 5.2 metres thick. The central court has a diameter of about 12 metres.

The broch lies about two miles south of Bow Castle Broch.

Excavations
The broch was first cleared out by James Curle in 1891 at which time much Roman pottery and glass, together with a 1st-century AD coin were found inside it.

It was systematically excavated in 1950 by Stuart Piggott. More Roman pottery and glass was found beneath the wall of the broch. The broch appears to have been built soon after the Romans withdrew from Scotland in about 100 AD, and was thrown down again shortly afterwards, perhaps by a Roman expedition preparing for the reoccupation of 140 AD. The many fragments of Roman material found in the broch might be explained as loot from the nearby legionary fort at Newstead (Trimontium).

References

Further reading
 Piggott, Stuart (1953), Excavations in the broch and hill-fort of Torwoodlee, Selkirkshire, 1950, Proc. Soc. Antiq. Scot., Vol.85
Curle, J. (1892) 'Notes on two brochs recently discovered at Bow, Midlothian, and Torwoodlee, Selkirkshire', Proc Soc Antiq Scot, vol. 26, Pages 68–70

External links

Archaeological sites in the Scottish Borders
Brochs
Scheduled Ancient Monuments in the Scottish Borders
Galashiels